Longleng District (Pron:/ˈlɒŋˌlɛŋ/) is one of the eleven districts of the Indian state of Nagaland. It is the eighth least populous district in the country (out of 640). The district is the home of the Phom Nagas, they are one of the major ethnic groups of Nagaland. Initially, Longleng was under the district administration of Tuensang District but later on it was bifurcated as a separate district in January 2004.

Geography
Carved out of Tuensang district, Longleng is the tenth district of Nagaland. It is bordered by Mon District to the east, Mokokchung District to the west and Tuensang District to the south. The district's headquarters is at Longleng, which is located at an altitude of about 1,066 m above sea level. Tamlu and Longleng are the major towns of the district. Its main river is the Dikhu River.

Demographics
According to the 2011 census Longleng District has a population of 50,484, roughly equal to the nation of Saint Kitts and Nevis. This gives it a ranking of 632nd in India (out of a total of 640). Longleng has a sex ratio of 903 females for every 1000 males, and a literacy rate of 73.1%. Scheduled Tribes make up 96.30% of the population. 15.08% of the population lives in urban areas.

Religion 

According to the 2011 official census, Christianity is the major religion in Longleng District with 48.849 Christians (96.76%), following by 873 Hindus (1.73%), 635 Muslims (1.26%), 77 Buddhists (0.15%), 5 Sikhs (<0.01%) and Not stated 45 (0.09%).

Language 
At the time of the 2011 census, 93.68% of the population spoke Phom and 1.83% Konyak as their first language.

Banking facilities in Longleng
List of banks functioning in Longleng.

State Bank Of India, Longleng

References

External links 
 Official website

 
2004 establishments in Nagaland
Districts of Nagaland